Sundown is the ninth studio album by Richard Marx that was released digitally on October 31, 2008. Sundown was released along with Emotional Remains.

This CD was never released as a commercial product.  It was only available on Richard's personal web site for a limited time.

Track listing
"Have a Little Faith" (Marx) – 4:45
"First Time Ever I Saw Your Face" (Ewan MacColl) – 4:30
"Suddenly" (Marx)  – 4:44 (duet with Toni Braxton)
"To My Senses" (Marx) – 4:56
"Wild Horses" (Mick Jagger, Keith Richards) – 6:06
"Loved" (Marx) – 3:39
"Can't Stop Crying" (Marx) – 4:16
"And I Love Her" (John Lennon, Paul McCartney) – 3:34 (duet with Vince Gill)
"Always on Your Mind" (Marx, Matt Scannell) – 4:57
"In This All Alone" (Marx) – 3:26
"Everything I Want" (Marx) – 5:23
"Ordinary Love" (Sade Adu, Stuart Matthewman) – 7:08

Album credits

Personnel
Greg Bissonette – drums
Steve Brewster – drums
Tom Bukovac – guitars
Cliff Colnot – string arrangements
J.T. Corenflos – guitars
Bruce Gaitsch – guitars
Mark Hill – bass guitar
Steve Hornbreak – keyboards
Dann Huff – guitars, producer
Sean Hurley – bass guitar
Michael Landau – guitars
Kevin Marks – electric guitar
Richard Marx – producer, arrangements, lead and background vocals, acoustic guitar, funk guitar, gut-string guitar, electric guitar, piano, keyboards, drum programming, synth bass, strings
Hector Pereira – gut-string guitar
Randy Pierce – guitars
Matt Scannell – guitars
Jimmie Lee Sloas – bass guitar
Michael Thompson – guitars
C.J. Vanston – drum programming, synth programming
Jonathan Yudkin – cello, strings

Background vocals
Jessica Andrews
Richard Marx

Engineers
David Cole
Chip Matthews
Justin Neibank
Mat Prock

Guest credits
Jessica Andrews
Toni Braxton
Cliff Colnot
Vince Gill
Matt Scannell

Miscellaneous
Album marks the first time songs that Marx did not write or co-write appeared on an American release
This is Marx's first studio album in which Fee Waybill does not contribute as a co-writer
This is Marx's second studio album to not have released a single
There is no personal dedication listed on this album
"Have A Little Faith", "Suddenly" (as a solo track) and "To My Senses" would appear on Beautiful Goodbye, Marx's 2014 release.

2008 albums
Richard Marx albums
Albums produced by Richard Marx
Self-released albums
Albums produced by Dann Huff